The 2003 MBNA America 400 was the 28th stock car race of the 2003 NASCAR Winston Cup Series season and the 35th iteration of the event. The race was held on Sunday, September 21, 2003, before a crowd of 137,000 in Dover, Delaware at Dover International Speedway, a 1-mile (1.6 km) permanent oval-shaped racetrack. The race took the scheduled 400 laps to complete. At race's end, Ryan Newman of Penske Racing South would come back from two laps down and save fuel at the end to win his eighth career NASCAR Winston Cup Series win and his seventh win of the season. To fill out the podium, Jeremy Mayfield of Evernham Motorsports and Tony Stewart of Joe Gibbs Racing would finish second and third, respectively.

Dale Earnhardt Jr. would suffer a concussion during the race on lap 363.

Background 

Dover International Speedway is an oval race track in Dover, Delaware, United States that has held at least two NASCAR races since it opened in 1969. In addition to NASCAR, the track also hosted USAC and the NTT IndyCar Series. The track features one layout, a 1-mile (1.6 km) concrete oval, with 24° banking in the turns and 9° banking on the straights. The speedway is owned and operated by Dover Motorsports.

The track, nicknamed "The Monster Mile", was built in 1969 by Melvin Joseph of Melvin L. Joseph Construction Company, Inc., with an asphalt surface, but was replaced with concrete in 1995. Six years later in 2001, the track's capacity moved to 135,000 seats, making the track have the largest capacity of sports venue in the mid-Atlantic. In 2002, the name changed to Dover International Speedway from Dover Downs International Speedway after Dover Downs Gaming and Entertainment split, making Dover Motorsports. From 2007 to 2009, the speedway worked on an improvement project called "The Monster Makeover", which expanded facilities at the track and beautified the track. After the 2014 season, the track's capacity was reduced to 95,500 seats.

Entry list 

*Withdrew.

Practice

First practice 
The first practice session was held on Saturday, September 20, at 11:15 AM EST, and would last for one hour and 15 minutes.

Second and final practice 
The second and final practice session, sometimes referred to as Happy Hour, was held on Saturday, September 20, at approximately 3:00 PM EST, and would last for approximately one hour.

Qualifying 
Qualifying was canceled due to the impeding threat of Hurricane Isabel. As a result, the current 2003 owner's standings were used to determine the lineup. Matt Kenseth of Roush Racing would win the pole.

Race results

References 

2003 NASCAR Winston Cup Series
NASCAR races at Dover Motor Speedway
September 2003 sports events in the United States
2003 in sports in Delaware